Andrew Lopez (born November 30, 1953) is a retired American college baseball coach.  He was most recently the head baseball coach at University of Arizona, and has served as the head baseball coach at Cal State Dominguez Hills, Pepperdine, and Florida.  Lopez compiled an overall win–loss record of 1,177–742–7 in thirty-three seasons as a head coach.

He is one of only three coaches to lead three different programs to the College World Series and one of only two coaches, along with Augie Garrido, to win the College World Series with two different programs. His Division I teams (Pepperdine, Florida, and Arizona) have appeared in the postseason seventeen out of twenty-six seasons. He has earned National Coach of the Year honors two times, and Conference Coach of the Year honors eight times.

Lopez began his head coaching career at Cal State Dominguez Hills, a Division II school, in 1983 and built the program into a national championship contender. The Toros won back-to-back California Collegiate Athletic Association (CCAA) Championships in 1986 and 1987. He was also named CCAA Coach of the Year in three consecutive seasons from 1985 to 1987. In six seasons as the head coach at Cal State Dominguez Hills, he compiled a 168-152-2(.525) record.

In 1989, he was hired as the head baseball coach Pepperdine Waves baseball team at Pepperdine University. In six seasons, he compiled a 241-107-3(.691) record. In only his first season, he went 41-19-1, and ultimately won four consecutive post-season tournaments. In 1992, his team won the only National Championship in school history. The 3–2 victory over Cal-State Fullerton earned him consensus National Coach of the Year honors.

During his seven seasons coaching the Florida Gators baseball team at the University of Florida, he compiled a 278-159-1(.636) record. He won two Southeastern Conference (SEC) championships and appeared in five NCAA Tournaments and two College World Series. While at UF, he coached major leaguers David Eckstein, Mark Ellis, Brad Wilkerson, David Ross, Ryan Shealy, and Josh Fogg.  He also averaged 39 wins per season, including a school record 50 games and a College World Series appearance in 1996.  Lopez, however, was controversial with some Gators faithful for not recruiting local players and for not extending scholarships to players that he did not recruit to the program.  His tenure crested with a second College World Series appearance in 1998.  Following a 35–27 season in 2001, Florida fired him.

After being dismissed by the University of Florida, Lopez was hired as head coach of the Arizona Wildcats baseball at the University of Arizona.  In his fourteen seasons as head coach, UofA qualified for the NCAA tournament eight times, including two College World Series appearances and one national championship.  His 2012 national championship team went undefeated in post-season play winning 10 games, three at the Tucson Regional, two at the Super Regional against St. John's at Hi Corbett Field in Tucson, and five at the College World Series in Omaha.  Lopez is only the second coach in NCAA history to win the CWS with two different teams.  As the Wildcats' head coach, Lopez has an overall record of 459-300-1 (.604), and a conference record of 174-165 (.513).

Lopez announced his retirement on May 25, 2015, in a press conference alongside Athletic Director Greg Byrne.

On July 18, 2017, the American Baseball Coaches Association announced that they would induct Andy Lopez into their 2018 Hall of Fame Class.

In 2022, Lopez was inducted into the College Baseball Hall of Fame.

Head coaching record

See also 

List of college baseball coaches with 1,100 wins

References

1953 births
Living people
American sportspeople of Mexican descent
Arizona Wildcats baseball coaches
Cal State Dominguez Hills Toros baseball coaches
Florida Gators baseball coaches
Pepperdine Waves baseball coaches
UCLA Bruins baseball players
Baseball players from Los Angeles
Sportspeople from Los Angeles